St. Joseph's Patrician College, often known as  "The Bish",  is a secondary school in the West Ireland city of Galway. Founded by the Patrician Brothers, a religious order, it has approximately 800 students on roll and, in recent years, has had success in a wide range of sporting activities including soccer, rugby, basketball, rowing, Gaelic games, athletics, and table tennis.

History

St Joseph's College (The Bish) was established in 1862 due to the absence of a Catholic Intermediate School for boys in the city. Bishop John McEvilly asked Brother Paul  to open such a school and St. Joseph's Seminary was established at Nuns' Island in 1862. Due to the bishop's close association  with  the school,  the seminary was generally referred to as "the bishop's school" and to this day is known as "The Bish." Publicising his new enterprise Bishop McEvilly wrote a pastoral  in which he stated:
"For many years we have had excellent schools for the lower orders at the Mercy Convent, Newtownsmith, and the Monastery School at Lombard St. The higher class of boys are catered for at St. Ignatius' College, the girls at the Dominican Convent. Now, at last, we happily have a school for the middle class at St. Joseph's Seminary, Nuns' Island."

When the school was established the word seminary had no ecclesiastical connotations and there was in fact a "Seminary For Young Ladies" further down Nuns' Island, by the 1930s the word had come to mean a college for the training of candidates for the priesthood, and at the express desire of Bishop Michael Brown the Brothers changed the name to "St. Joseph's College", and in the 1970s Bro. Valerian Whelan inserted the word Patrician in the title.

In 1899 a National School was opened to cater for the Junior Classes at the Seminary and it too came to be known as "The Bish". In 1930 the Brothers acquired the bonded store belonging to Persse's Distillery, renovated it and transferred the seventy Intermediate pupils across the road.  The National School took over the rooms vacated on the original site and continued in operation until 1954 when it and "the Old Monastery School" were replaced by St. Patrick's, on Lombard Street.

Extra curricular activities

Drama
Plays and talent shows are often performed annually by the students of St. Joseph's Patrician College.

Rowing

St Joseph's College Rowing Club was established in 1932, making its first competitive appearance against St. Patrick's Boat Club later that year in the Schoolboy Fours. It did not acquire its own boathouse until 1955, when the Menlo Emmet's donated their Woodquay premises to the school under the agreement it should never be used for anything but the development of rowing. The club was a dominant player in the Junior National Championships which had been established in 1964, and has won a number of national championships in various grades.

Internationally, oarsmen from St. Joseph's College R.C. have also excelled, as a club competing at The British School Regatta, Ghent International Regatta, Henley Royal Regatta, and the Sydney International Rowing Regatta in March 2013. Many have represented Ireland on the international stage at all levels of competition from the Home International Regatta (Ireland, England, Scotland and Wales), to the Coupe de la Jeunesse (second level European Junior Championship) and the World Junior Championship. Alumni of the school have achieved even higher laurels following on from their experience gained on the Corrib, competing at the World U-23 Championships, World Senior Championships and the Olympic Games.

Rugby
In rugby, teams from the school have won 10 Connacht Schools Junior Cups (last in 1991) and 12 Connacht Schools Senior Cups (last in 1994).

Other titles include the U-14 Connacht Schools League (2010, 2012 2013), Junior Schools Connacht League (2010), Junior Schools City Cup (2012, 2013), Senior Schools Development Cup (2010, 2012), and U-17 Connacht Schools 7's (2012, 2013).

The Bish has been remarkably successful in producing quality rugby teams and players since the school was founded. Many players have represented played on representative teams provincially and nationally, at both under-age and senior level. Among these are Damian Browne, Andrew Browne and Darragh Leader, all of whom have played at senior level for local professional side Connacht Rugby. The Bish currently fields teams at all school age levels - Under 14, Junior and Senior. The U-14's compete in the Connacht U-14 Schools League, the Juniors partake in the Connacht Junior League, Junior Cup and City Cup and the Senior Team play in the U-18 Connacht Regional League as well as the Connacht Senior Development Cup.

Basketball
Basketball is also played.

Notable alumni 

Politics
Michael Colivet (29 March 1882 – 4 May 1955) was a Sinn Féin politician. He was elected TD for Limerick City, a founding member of the Irish Republic, and elected to the First Dail.
Séamus Brennan, (1948–2008) Fianna Fáil politician, Teachta Dála and minister of various portfolios, most notably Transport where he oversaw the introduction of the penalty point system.

Sport
Andrew Browne, Connacht rugby player
Damian Browne, Oyonnax rugby player
David Collins, Galway hurler and former Young Hurler of The Year
Adrian Faherty, Galway Gaelic footballer
Ger Farragher, former Galway hurler
David Forde, Millwall and Republic of Ireland footballer
Ciaran Gaffney, Zebre rugby player
Colin Hawkins, Shamrock Rovers Assistant Manager
Darragh Leader, Connacht rugby player
Tadhg Leader, rugby player
Eamonn McGuire, rugby player for Connacht and Ireland
Neville Maxwell, Olympic rower
John Russell, Sligo Rovers footballer

References

1862 establishments in Ireland
Buildings and structures in Galway (city)
Education in Galway (city)
Educational institutions established in 1862
Patrician Brothers schools
Secondary schools in County Galway